List of urban rail systems in Thailand lists urban rail transit systems in Thailand. As of 2018, Bangkok is the only Thai city which has operational urban rail systems.

Bangkok Metropolitan Region

Bangkok Metropolitan Region is, served by three rapid transit rail systems. The BTS Skytrain consists of two elevated lines, the Sukhumvit Line and the Silom Line. The underground Metropolitan Rapid Transit (MRT) also consists of two lines, the Blue Line and Purple Line. Finally, the elevated Airport Rail Link (ARL) links to Suvarnabhumi Airport. Although proposals for the development of rapid transit in Bangkok had been made since 1975, leading to plans for the failed Lavalin Skytrain, it was only in 1999 that the BTS finally began operation.

Commuter Rail
State Railway of Thailand will operate Red Line and Light Red Line
Airport rail link
SRT Electrified Train operates Airport Rail Link
Rapid transit
BTS Skytrain operates Light Green Line and Dark Green Line
Metropolitan Rapid Transit operates Blue Line, Purple Line and the future Orange Line
Monorail
Mass Rapid Transit Authority of Thailand will operate Pink Line and Yellow Line

Nonthaburi and Pak Kret
Nonthaburi and Pak Kret will be served by three MRT lines: MRT Purple Line, MRT Brown Line, and MRT Pink Line. These lines are the part of M-Map.

Nonthaburi Civic Center Station will be the central metro station of Nonthaburi Province.

Rangsit
Rangsit Municipality will be served by SRT Dark Red Line which is the part of SRT Red Lines commuter rail. In the future, the line will be extended north to Thammasat University. The city will be also served by three BRT lines.

Samut Prakan
Samut Prakan Municipality is served by the Sukhumvit Line, part of the BTS Skytrain. The full extension from Bearing to Kheha opened in December 2018.

Samut Sakhon
Samut Sakhon municipality will be served by the SRT Dark Red Line, part of the SRT Red Lines commuter rail. In the future, the line will link Bangkok and Maha Chai in Samut Sakhon.

Central

Phitsanulok
In Phitsanulok, there is a plan to build a tramway system which has several lines. The project will be modelled on the Sydney tramway network.

Eastern

Pattaya
Pattaya City had a plan to build a monorail line consisting of ten stations. As of 2018, there has been no progress. A 50 million baht feasibility project would be commissioned first. The monorail could open by 2026 with additional lines added in the 2030s. As of 2023, the plan was for a 8.3km line with 13 stops, linking to the Don Mueang–Suvarnabhumi–U-Tapao high-speed railway.

Northern

Chiang Mai

Chiang Mai Municipality has one existing monorail system, Chiang Mai Zoo Monorail, used for excursions within the zoo. Plans for an electric rail system have been discussed for years. In 2018, the plans seem to have gained traction. The Mass Rapid Transit Authority of Thailand (MRTA) announced that the bidding process for a tram network in Chiang Mai could begin in 2020. The  tramway, both above and below ground, is estimated to cost 86 billion baht. It is projected that the first of three lines could break ground in 2021, and the system could be operational by roughly 2027.

Northeastern

Khon Kaen

In Khon Kaen, there is a plan to build a Light Rail with several lines. In 2016, a 26 kilometer-long light rail line was proposed. The light rail line, which is to be funded by local government and businesses instead of the central government, hopes to begin construction in 2019.

Nakhon Ratchasima
Nakhon Ratchasima Municipality has a plan to build five elevated bus rapid transit (or Skybus) lines with the name Korat Rapid Transit. As of 2018, there has been no progress. Later, there is a plan to build a tramway system of several lines. The project will be modelled on the Sydney tramway network.

Southern

Hat Yai and Songkhla
Hat Yai monorail is a planned 12.54 kilometer-long elevated monorail consisted of 12 stations. As of 2016, the line is being studied by a university and the government. The design of the stations has been completed. The project will cost approximately 15,799 million baht to construct. It is hoped that construction will begin in 2019.

State Railway of Thailand (SRT) has a plan to build commuter rail linking Hat Yai and Songkhla by reusing a defunct railway line that closed in 1978.

Phuket Island

The Mass Rapid Transit Authority of Thailand (MRTA) announced in 2018 that bidding to construct a 60 kilometre-long, 23 station tram network in Phuket will commence in 2020. The 39 billion baht tram is part of the government's Private-Public-Partnership (PPP) plan which ensures it will be fast-tracked. The planned route stretches from Takua Thung District in Phang Nga Province to Chalong in Phuket. Phase one will connect Phuket International Airport with Chalong, about 40 kilometres. It will take three years to complete. The project will be modelled on the Sydney tramway network.

See also
 Mass Rapid Transit Master Plan in Bangkok Metropolitan Region
 List of tram and light-rail transit systems
 List of bus rapid transit systems
 List of rapid transit systems
 Phuket Island Light Rail Transit
 Khon Kaen Light Rail Transit

References

External links

Official sites
Chiang Mai Light Rail Transit
Hat Yai Monorail
Khon Kaen Light Rail Transit
Nakhon Ratchasima Light Rail Transit
Pattaya Monorail
Phitsanulok Tram
Phuket Island Light Rail Transit

Public transport in Thailand